FireHouse is an American glam metal band formed in Charlotte, North Carolina, in 1989. The band has released 7 studio albums, a live album, 2 video albums, 11 singles and 9 music videos.
FireHouse signed a deal with Epic Records in 1989 and released their self-titled debut the following year. It reached double platinum in the States and reached gold in other countries. The record spawned 4 singles and launched the group into their sophomore effort, which reached platinum in the US. Hold Your Fire spawned 3 singles. Their third release, aptly titled 3, spawned their final 2 singles. They would go on to release an acoustic album, a live album, 3 albums that held no chart positions, a greatest hits compilation and a re-recorded album of their hits. C.J. Snare has stated they have sold over 7 million worldwide albums.

Albums

Studio albums

Live albums 
Bring 'Em Out Live (1999)

Compilation albums 
The Best of FireHouse (1998)
Super Hits: The Best of FireHouse (2000)
Playlist: The Very Best of FireHouse (2003)
Full Circle (2011)

Video albums

Singles

Music videos 
 All She Wrote - © 1991 Sony BMG Entertainment
 Don't Treat Me Bad - © 1991 Sony BMG Entertainment
 Overnight Sensation - © 1991 Sony BMG Entertainment
 Love of a Lifetime - © 1991 Sony BMG Entertainment
 Reach for the Sky - © 1992 Sony BMG Entertainment
 Sleeping With You - © 1992 Sony BMG Entertainment
 When I Look Into Your Eyes - © 1992 Sony BMG Entertainment
 Here For You - © 1995 Sony BMG Entertainment
 I Live My Life For You - © 1995 Sony BMG Entertainment

References 

Discographies of American artists
Rock music group discographies
Discography